A Specified Associated Organisation is an organization of members of the British Liberal Democrats formed around a specific trait and designated by the Federal Executive as affiliates of the party. SAOs are distinguished from other Liberal Democrat pressure groups (also known as Associated Organizations) in that SAOs can review and input policies.

SAOs include the following:
 ethnic minorities (LDCRE),
 women (WLD),
 the LGBT community (LGBT+ Liberal Democrats),
 youth and students (Young Liberals),
 engineers and scientists (ALDES),
 parliamentary candidates (PCA)
 and local councillors (ALDC).

See also
 Socialist society

References

Organisation of the Liberal Democrats (UK)